The 183rd New York State Legislature, consisting of the New York State Senate and the New York State Assembly, met from January 3, 1979, to December 31, 1980, during the fifth and sixth years of Hugh Carey's governorship, in Albany.

Background
Under the provisions of the New York Constitution of 1938 and the U.S. Supreme Court decision to follow the One man, one vote rule, re-apportioned in 1971, and amended in 1974, by the Legislature, 60 Senators and 150 assemblymen were elected in single-seat districts for two-year terms. Senate and Assembly districts consisted of approximately the same number of inhabitants, the area being apportioned contiguously without restrictions regarding county boundaries.

At this time there were two major political parties: the Republican Party and the Democratic Party. The Conservative Party, the Right to Life Party, the Liberal Party, the Libertarian Party, the Socialist Workers Party, the Communist Party and the Labor Party also nominated tickets.

Elections
The New York state election, 1978, was held on November 7. Governor Hugh Carey was re-elected, and Secretary of State Mario Cuomo was elected Lieutenant Governor, both Democrats. The elections to the other two statewide elective offices resulted in a Republican Comptroller and a Democratic Attorney General. The approximate party strength at this election, as expressed by the vote for Governor, was: Democrats 2,306,000; Republicans 1,913,000; Conservatives 243,000; Right to Life 130,000; Liberals 123,000; Libertarians 19,000; Socialist Workers 13,000; Communists 11,000; and Labor 9,000.

Seven of the ten women members of the previous legislature were elected again: State Senators Olga A. Méndez (Dem.), of East Harlem, and Linda Winikow (Dem.), of Spring Valley; and Assemblywomen Elizabeth Connelly (Dem.), of Staten Island; Pinny Cooke (Rep.), of Rochester; Estella B. Diggs (Dem.), of the Bronx; and Gerdi E. Lipschutz (Dem.), of Queens, were re-elected; and Assemblywoman Mary B. Goodhue (Rep.), a lawyer of Mount Kisco, was elected to the State Senate. Carol Berman (Dem.), of Lawrence, was also elected to the State Senate. Rhoda S. Jacobs (Dem.), of Brooklyn; Joan B. Hague (Rep.), of Glens Falls; May W. Newburger (Dem.), of Great Neck; Toni Rettaliata (Rep.), of Huntington; and Florence M. Sullivan (Rep.), a lawyer of Brooklyn, were also elected to the Assembly. Thus the 183rd Legislature had 13 women members, surpassing the previous record of 11 in the 181st New York State Legislature (1976).

The New York state election, 1979, was held on November 6. No statewide elective offices were up for election, and there were no vacancies in the Legislature.

Sessions
The Legislature met for the first regular session (the 202nd) at the State Capitol in Albany on January 3, 1979; and recessed indefinitely in the early morning of June 17.

Stanley Fink (Dem.) was elected Speaker.

Warren M. Anderson (Rep.) was re-elected Temporary President of the State Senate.

The Legislature was again in session on and off in October and November 1979, to consider legislation concerning energy matters.

The Legislature met for the second regular session (the 203rd) at the State Capitol in Albany on January 9, 1980; and recessed indefinitely on June 15.

The Legislature met for a special session at the State Capitol in Albany from November 19 to 23.  This session was called by Governor Carey to consider legislation on banking, the State budget, and housing in New York City.

State Senate

Senators
The asterisk (*) denotes members of the previous Legislature who continued in office as members of this Legislature. Christopher J. Mega, Mary B. Goodhue, Charles D. Cook and John B. Daly changed from the Assembly to the Senate.

Note: For brevity, the chairmanships omit the words "...the Committee on (the)..."

Employees
 Secretary: Roger C. Thompson

State Assembly

Assemblymen
The asterisk (*) denotes members of the previous Legislature who continued in office as members of this Legislature.

Note: For brevity, the chairmanships omit the words "...the Committee on (the)..."

Employees
 Clerk: Catherine A. Carey

Notes

Sources
 New York State Information Handbook prepared for the U.S. Dept of Energy (December 31, 1980)

183
1979 in New York (state)
1980 in New York (state)
1979 U.S. legislative sessions
1980 U.S. legislative sessions